Nalkheda is a town (Tehsil) and a nagar Parishad in Agar Malwa district in the Indian state of Madhya Pradesh. Nalkheda is situated on the bank of river Lakhunder.

Distance from Indore 150 km, from Ujjain 100 km, from Kota, Rajasthan 170 km, from Bhopal 180 km, from Agar 35 km, from Shajapur 62 km by road, from Dongargaon, Agar Malwa 56 km by road. It is just 15 km from Aamla Chourha situated between Agar malwa & Susner at the Indore Kota state highway (SH 27).

Demographics

As of the 2011 Census of India, Nalkheda had a population of 16,559. Males constitute 52% of the population and females 48%. Nalkheda has an average literacy rate of 59%, lower than the national average of 59.5%: male literacy is 68%, and female literacy is 49%. In Nalkheda, 17% of the population is under 6 years of age.
Pipalyaset Village that comes under Nalkheda Tehsil is the most cultivated land area and good for agriculture purpose.

Visitor attractions 
Nalkheda is noted for the 8th Manifactation of 10, Peetambara Siddh Peeth Maa Bagalamukhi Temple. Worshipped By Pandvas. There is a river named Lakhunder which is just behind the temple. There is an entrance gate formed like a lion.

Nalkheda is the hub of business for more than 90 villages that comes under this tehsil.

References

Cities and towns in Agar Malwa district